Vavoua Department is a department of Haut-Sassandra Region in Sassandra-Marahoué District, Ivory Coast. In 2021, its population was 477,154 and its seat is the settlement of Vavoua. The sub-prefectures of the department are Bazra-Nattis, Dananon, Dania, Kétro-Bassam, Séitifla, and Vavoua.

Economy
Local industries include cocoa, cotton growing, and logging.

History
Vavoua Department was created in 1988 as a first-level subdivision via a split-off from Daloa Department.

In 1997, regions were introduced as new first-level subdivisions of Ivory Coast; as a result, all departments were converted into second-level subdivisions. Vavoua Department was included in Haut-Sassandra Region.

In 2011, districts were introduced as new first-level subdivisions of Ivory Coast. At the same time, regions were reorganised and became second-level subdivisions and all departments were converted into third-level subdivisions. At this time, Vavoua Department remained part of the retained Haut-Sassandra Region in the new Sassandra-Marahoué District.

Vavoua International School, a Christian missionary boarding school run by WEC International, was situated in the department, adjacent to the small village of Bouitafla, until the Second Ivorian Civil War forced its closing.

Notes

Departments of Haut-Sassandra
1988 establishments in Ivory Coast
States and territories established in 1988